Westbrook Inc. is an American multimedia and entertainment venture company founded by actor Will Smith and his wife, actress Jada Pinkett Smith. The company was founded in 2019, in order to execute the Smith Family's global content. It is headquartered in Calabasas, California, with 80 employees as of March 2021.

The company signed a first-look deal with National Geographic in 2021.

Westbrook's debut film, King Richard, garnered widespread acclaim and earned numerous awards including six nominations (including Best Picture; the first nomination for this company) at 94th Academy Awards and four nominations at the 79th Golden Globe Awards (including Best Motion Picture – Drama), winning Best Actor – Motion Picture Drama for Smith.

Filmography

Films

Television

References

External links 
 

2019 establishments in California
American companies established in 2019
Companies based in Calabasas, California
Entertainment companies based in California
Film production companies of the United States
Mass media companies established in 2019
Privately held companies based in California
Television production companies of the United States
Will Smith